Rhonda Glenn (May 6, 1946 – February 12, 2015) was an American sportscaster, author and a manager of communications for the USGA beginning in 1996 until her retirement in May 2013. The next year, she won the Golf Writers Association of America's William D. Richardson Award.

Early years 
Glenn began playing golf at age six, and won the Florida High School Athletic Association golf title twice. As an amateur golfer, she played in five U.S. Women's Amateur Championships and two U.S. Women's Open. Glenn won the Florida East Coast Golf Tournament in 1965.

Career 
Early in her broadcast career, Glenn was a talk show host and presented the weather and news at WAVY-TV in Portsmouth/Norfolk/Newport News in the 1970s.  She was so popular at WAVY that the city of Portsmouth renamed the street where the station was located in her honor.

She was the first full-time national TV network female sportscaster when she began broadcasting at ESPN on February 6, 1981. Glenn was a golf commentator for ABC from 1978 to 1994. She was also  a correspondent for Golf World Magazine and a regular contributor to Golf Journal.

She is the author or co-author of several books on golf, including The Illustrated History of Women's Golf (1992 winner of the USGA International Book Award), Golf for Women, The Beginner's Guide to Great Golf for Women, The Rules of Golf Simplified, The Junior Golf Book and Breaking the Mold: The Journey of the Only Woman President of the United States Golf Association.

Death 
Glenn lived in Roanoke, Texas. She died of cancer on February 12, 2015, in Gainesville, Florida, aged 68.

References

External links
Amazon.com: Books by Rhonda Glenn
USGA International Book Award

1946 births
2015 deaths
American sports announcers
Golf writers and broadcasters
People from Palm Beach, Florida
Deaths from cancer in Florida
Women sports announcers
People from Roanoke, Texas
Golfers from Florida
Sportspeople from Palm Beach, Florida